Maila Talvio née Winter, married Mikkola (October 17, 1871, Hartola – January 6, 1951, Helsinki), was a Finnish writer. Talvio was a leading Finnish writer on the temperance question and several of her works were translated into Swedish and other languages.
She was nominated for the Nobel Prize in Literature three times.

Life
Her parents were Adolf Magnus Winter and Julia Malvina Bonsdorf, who had a family of 9 children. Talvio's father died when Maila was 9 years old.

Her husband was J. J. Mikkola, a renowned scholar of Slavic linguistics, whom she married in 1893. She is buried in Hietaniemi Cemetery in Helsinki.

Books

Awards
 Valtion kirjallisuuspalkinto (1936)
 Aleksis Kiven kirjallisuuspalkinto (1940)

Notes

References 
Facta 2001, Finnish

External links
 

1871 births
1951 deaths
People from Hartola, Finland
People from Mikkeli Province (Grand Duchy of Finland)
Finnish writers
Writers from Päijät-Häme
Finnish women writers
Burials at Hietaniemi Cemetery
Finnish temperance activists